Kazakhtelecom JSC is the largest telecommunication company in Kazakhstan.

Shareholders 
 51.00% - AO Samruk-Kazyna JSC - fund of national wealth
 16.90% - Bodam B.V. (Amsterdam, Netherland)
 14.60% - Bank of New York
  9.60% - Deran Services Limited
  3.00% - Optimus Ltd
  0.70% - shares traded on KASE
  4.20% - other shareholders

KazakhTelecom subsidiaries 
 K-Cell
 51% Fintur Holdings B.V.
 58.55% TeliaSonera
 41.45% Turkcell
 49% KazakhTelecom JSC

 Altel
 100% KazakhTelecom JSC

 Neo-Kazakhstan
 51% KazakhTelecom JSC
 49% AsiaNet Kazakhstan LLP

See also
 List of mobile network operators of the Asia Pacific region#Kazakhstan

References

External links 
KazakhTelecom - Official site in Kazakh, Russian and English

Communications in Kazakhstan
Companies based in Astana
Telecommunications companies established in 1994
Companies of Kazakhstan
1994 establishments in Kazakhstan
Kazakhstani brands
Companies listed on the Kazakhstan Stock Exchange